The 2007 Men's World Team Squash Championships is the men's edition of the 2007 World Team Squash Championships organized by the World Squash Federation, which serves as the world team championship for squash players. The event were held in Chennai, India and took place from 6–12 December 2007. The tournament was organized by the World Squash Federation and the Squash Rackets Federation of India. The England team won his fourth World Team Championships beating the Australian team in the final.

Participating teams 
A total of 29 teams competed from all the five confederations: Africa, America, Asia, Europe and Oceania. For Chinese Taipei, Sri Lanka and Venezuela it was their first participation at a world team championship.

Seeds

Squads 

  Egypt
 Amr Shabana
 Karim Darwish
 Wael El Hindi
 Mohammed Abbas

  Germany
 Simon Rösner
 Tim Weber
 Moritz Dahmen
 Johannes Voit

  Finland
 Olli Tuominen
 Matias Tuomi
 Henrik Mustonen
 not held

  Russia
 Alexei Severinov
 Valery Litvinko
 Sergey Kostrykin
 not held

  England
 Nick Matthew
 James Willstrop
 Lee Beachill
 Peter Barker

  Hong Kong
 Dick Lau
 Wei Hang Wong
 Max Lee
 Anson Kwong

  Spain
 Borja Golán
 David Vidal
 Alejandro Garbi
 Arturo Tomas

  France
 Grégory Gaultier
 Thierry Lincou
 Renan Lavigne
 Julien Balbo

  United States
 Julian Illingworth
 Chris Gordon
 Jamie Crombie
 Richard Chin

  Japan
 Jun Matsumoto
 Takanori Shimizu
 Yuta Fukui
 Ken Okada

  Venezuela
 Francisco Valecillo
 Luis Hernandez
 Richard Prieto
 Juan Pablo Sanchez

  Australia
 David Palmer
 Stewart Boswell
 Cameron Pilley
 Scott Arnold

  New Zealand
 Kashif Shuja
 Campbell Grayson
 Martin Knight
 Josh Greenfield

  Scotland
 Alan Clyne
 Harry Leitch
 Stuart Crawford
 Jamie Macauley

  Malaysia
 Mohd Azlan Iskandar
 Ong Beng Hee
 Mohd Nafiizwan Adnan
 Muhd Asyraf Azan

  South Africa
 Steve Coppinger
 Adrian Hansen
 Jesse Engelbrecht
 Clinton Leeuw

  Kuwait
 Bader Al-Hussaini
 Abdullah Al Muzayen
 Mohammed Hajeyah
 Nasser Al Ramezi

  Sri Lanka
 Saman Tilakaratne
 Navin Samarasingh
 Anura Hewage
 Kavinda Cooray

  Canada
 Jonathon Power
 Shahier Razik
 Matthew Giuffre
 Shawn Delierre

  Ireland
 Liam Kenny
 John Rooney
 Derek Ryan
 Arthur Gaskin

  Austria
 Aqeel Rehman
 Jakob Dirnberger
 Andreas Freudensprung
 Stefan Brauneis

  Pakistan
 Aamir Atlas Khan
 Mansoor Zaman
 Farhan Mehboob
 Yasir Butt

  India
 Saurav Ghosal
 Ritwik Bhattacharya
 Siddharth Suchde
 Gaurav Nandrajog

  Kenya
 Hardeep Reel
 Rajdeep Bains
 Hartaj Bains
 Otto Kwach

  Bermuda
 Chase Toogood
 Melrindo Caines
 Robert Maycock
 not held

  Netherlands
 Laurens Jan Anjema
 Dylan Bennett
 Tom Hoevenaars
 Piëdro Schweertman

  Wales
 Alex Gough
 David Evans
 Jethro Binns
 Rob Sutherland

  Sweden
 Christian Drakenberg
 Rasmus Hult
 Gustav Detter
 Badr Abdel Aziz

  Chinese Taipei
 Chung-Yu Chang
 Hsuen-Chih Huang
 Kai-Han Chuang
 Ching-Han Chen

Group stage results

Pool A

Pool B

Pool C

Pool D

Pool E

Pool F

Pool G

Pool H

Finals

Draw

Results

Quarter-finals

Semi-finals

Final

Post-tournament team ranking

See also 
World Team Squash Championships
World Squash Federation
2007 Men's World Open Squash Championship

References

External links 
SquashSite World Team 2007 Official Website

W
World Squash Championships
Squash
Sports competitions in Chennai
2000s in Chennai
Squash tournaments in India
International sports competitions hosted by India